Superstition is a belief, not based on human reason or scientific knowledge, that future events may be influenced by one's behaviour in some magical or mystical way.

Superstition may also refer to:
 "Superstition" (song), a 1972 song by Stevie Wonder, covered in 1973 by Beck, Bogert & Appice and in 1986 by Stevie Ray Vaughan
 Superstition (Siouxsie and the Banshees album), 1991
 Superstition (Shirley Scott album), 1973
 Superstition (The Birthday Massacre album), 2014
 Superstition Freeway, the part of U.S. Route 60 through Metropolitan Phoenix, Arizona
 Superstition Mountains, a range of mountains east of Phoenix, Arizona
 "Superstitious" (song), a 1988 song by Europe
 Superstitious (novel), a 1995 novel by R. L. Stine
 Superstition (1919 film), a German film directed by Georg Jacoby
 Superstition (1920 film), a 1920 film starring Hoot Gibson
 Superstition (1982 film), a 1982 horror film
 Superstition (TV series), a 2017 television series
 Superstition (play), a play by James Nelson Barker
 Superstitions (advertising campaign), an advertising campaign for Anheuser-Busch's Bud Light

See also
 Baseball superstition
 List of superstitions
 Russian traditions and superstitions
 Theatrical superstitions